Erik Liener (born 2 October 1994) is a Slovak football midfielder who currently plays for Košice.

Club career
He started off his career at Prievidza. Afterwards he went on at Dubnica, where they're focused on working  with young players. He played 28 games with 1 goal for Dubnica.

1. SC Znojmo
He came to Znojmo from Dubnica at the beginning of the year 2014.

References

External links
1. SC Znojmo profile
Gambrinus Liga profile

Eurofotbal profile

1994 births
Living people
People from Prievidza
Sportspeople from the Trenčín Region
Slovak footballers
Slovak expatriate footballers
Association football midfielders
FK Dubnica players
MFK Ružomberok players
1. SC Znojmo players
MFK Lokomotíva Zvolen players
FK Iskra Borčice players
FC Sellier & Bellot Vlašim players
FK Baník Sokolov players
FC Košice (2018) players
2. Liga (Slovakia) players
Slovak Super Liga players
Czech First League players
Czech National Football League players
Expatriate footballers in the Czech Republic
Slovak expatriate sportspeople in the Czech Republic